This is a list of notable events relating to the environment in 1981. They relate to environmental law, conservation, environmentalism and environmental issues.

Events
The Protected Natural Areas Programme began in New Zealand.
The Wildlife and Countryside Act 1981 is passed in the United Kingdom

April
The Japan Australia Migratory Bird Agreement treaty came into force. It aims to minimise harm to the major areas used by birds which migrate between the two countries.

See also

Human impact on the environment
List of environmental issues